is a Japanese erotic original video animation (OVA) released by Digital Works. It is a based on eroge video game by Nikukyuu. The story revolves around Masahiko, a troubled young man who is forever holding onto the image of a beautiful woman who aided him when he was injured as a child. As a result, he has sworn to hold on to his virginity, until he is able to find the woman who haunts his memories.

Synopsis
In the first episode, a young woman called Shu Fong Lee, coincidentally turns up at his house. She is there because Masahiko's father is a karate master and she is to be his temporary student from America. She also knew and played with Masahiko when he was little. Kyoko Saeki (a family friend of Masahiko who lives next door and helps around his household since his mother has died) is jealous of Fong Lee after she takes over in doing the household duties and spends a lot of time with Masahiko and his father. After hearing that Masahiko is not interested in karate, Fong Lee has a negative view of him, believing him to be weak. However, after saving her life from a gang of rapists, her opinion of Masahiko improves and they become good friends. Masahiko even takes up karate believing that she is the girl in his memories. However, she suddenly leaves to go back to America, with Masahiko just catching her at the airport before she boards the plane. She reasons that as she wants to compete with Masahiko some day, they can't train together in the same dojo. She also reveals that she wasn't the one in his memory, but admits to having some feelings for Masahiko.

In the second episode, the final exams in school are over and Masahiko is becoming very popular at school after his heroics saving Fong Lee. This causes a schoolgirl called Aoi Tsutsuse to fall in love with Masahiko and forces herself on to Masahiko, having oral sex in a public cinema. However she is rejected by Masahiko afterwards. Masahiko is met with his teacher, Mrs Hanako. She wants and gets a sperm sample from him, as he gets the highest results in the final exams and she wants to collect the sperm of people with excellent genes for reasons undisclosed. Aoi tries again to seduce Masahiko, but after accepting his second rejection, she masturbates in front of him as this was the only way for her to relieve herself of this love. Masahiko, seeing this, could not stop himself from having oral sex with her, but it does not go any further. Meanwhile, Masahiko's father has a new girlfriend, who turns out to be Miss Hanako. He stumbles on to them having bondage sex together in the dojo. The winter holidays arrive, with Masahiko, his best friend Yuya, Kyoko and her little sister Asuka (who is in love with Masahiko) all going on a skiing holiday. Asuka tells Masahiko her feelings for him, but is rejected by Masahiko. After telling her about his memory of the girl, she realises that it was Kyoko who was the girl. She sacrifices her love for Masahiko so her sister and Masahiko can be happy together. The story ends with Masahiko and his dream girl, who was Kyoko all along, making love together.

English version
An English dubbed version of the OVA was released on DVD, with voicework done by several adult film stars, most notably Ron Jeremy, Abbey Wade, and Natalie Fiori. It is currently available as a Region 1 DVD and can be easily purchased through websites like Amazon or AnimeNation.

Eroge
Girl Next Door is based on eroge by Nikukyuu. The plot of the game is almost identical from the anime. The player can choose only one heroine.

Reception

Robert Nelson, writing for T.H.E.M. Anime Reviews, described the premise as having potential, but the execution was very very poor, feeling that the central character had lost his virginity after receiving oral sex.  Chris Beveridge enjoyed the humour in the work and the character designs, recommending Girl Next Door for couples. Michael Thomas felt the character designs were good, but stereotypical, and appreciated Asuka's maturity at the end.  En Hong appreciated the comedy grounding of Girl Next Door, and felt that it would be a strong show even without the sex scenes, but noted that they added to the comedy. Bamboo Dong felt that Girl Next Door was "worth it" for the comedy alone, noting that as it is relatively softcore, it would be perfect for group viewing.

References

External links
 

2000 anime OVAs
Hentai anime and manga
Eroge
Anime film and television articles using incorrect naming style